Jeremy Strong (born 18 November 1949) is a British writer credited with over 100 children's books. He previously worked in a bakery, where his job involved putting jam into doughnuts. He also worked as caretaker, a strawberry-picker and in an office for British Rail.

Life and career

Strong was born in New Eltham in London on the 18th November 1949.  He attended Wyborne Primary School, east London, Haberdashers Aske's Boys' School and the University of York. After university he became a junior school teacher while beginning his writing career, publishing his first book Smith's Tail, a picture story for young children in 1978.

Strong left teaching in 1991 and has been writing full-time ever since. His humorous writing often makes use of his childhood and primary teaching experiences. His story There's A Viking In My Bed was made into a BBC children's TV series and he has won several awards including the prestigious "Children's Book Award 1997" for The Hundred Mile an Hour Dog, the "Manchester Book Award" for his teen novel Stuff and the "Sheffield Book Award" for Beware, Killer Tomatoes.

Strong regularly writes stories for dyslexic children, published by the specialist publisher, Barrington Stoke. He lives near Bath in England, with his wife Gillie, two cats and four hens.

References

External links

 
 
 
  

1949 births
Living people
English children's writers
English male writers
People from Eltham